The Roman Catholic Diocese of San Luis, is located in the city of San Luis, capital city of San Luis Province in the Cuyo region of Argentina.

History
On 20 April 1934 Pope Pius XI founded the archdiocese as the Vicariate Apostolic of San Juan de Cuyo from territory taken from the Diocese of San Juan de Cuyo.

Bishops

Ordinaries
 Pedro Dionisio Tibiletti (1934–1945)
 Emilio Antonio di Pasquo (1946–1961), appointed Bishop of Avellaneda 
 Carlos María Cafferata (1961–1971)
 Juan Rodolfo Laise O.F.M.Cap. (1971–2001)
 Jorge Luis Lona (2001 – February 22, 2011)
 Pedro Daniel Martinez Perea (February 22, 2011 – June 9, 2020); previously, had been Coadjutor Bishop
 Gabriel Bernardo Barba (June 9, 2020 -

Coadjutor bishops
Juan Rodolfo Laise, O.F.M.Cap. (1971)
Jorge Luis Lona (2000-2001)
Pedro Daniel Martínez Perea (2009-2011)

References

San Luis
San Luis
San Luis
San Luis